Russ Granik is an American sports executive who served as Deputy Commissioner of the National Basketball Association (NBA) for 22 years.  He retired from that position on July 1, 2006, after 30 years with the NBA. Granik was inducted into the Naismith Memorial Basketball Hall of Fame on September 8, 2013, alongside basketball legends including Gary Payton, Bernard King, Rick Pitino, and Jerry Tarkanian. He was enshrined into the Hall of Fame by Jerry Colangelo. During his professional career, Granik served as the announcer of second-round picks in the NBA Draft and in later years, the television host of the NBA Draft Lottery.

NBA Deputy Commissioner
Granik was the lead negotiator for the NBA for the past four collective bargaining negotiations with the NBA players' union.  He also represented the league in negotiating numerous television deals, and in his role with USA Basketball helped lobby FIBA, the world sanctioning body for basketball, to permit professional basketball players to play in the Olympic Games.  That eligibility rule change led directly to the formation of the Dream Team that represented the United States at the 1992 Summer Olympics in Barcelona, Spain. He also served as President of USA Basketball and Chairperson of Naismith Memorial Basketball Hall of Fame.

Education
Granik graduated magna cum laude from Dartmouth College in 1969 and from Harvard Law School.

References

External links
NBA press release announcing Granik's departure
 

Date of birth missing (living people)
Living people
Dartmouth College alumni
Harvard Law School alumni
Naismith Memorial Basketball Hall of Fame inductees
National Basketball Association league office executives
Year of birth missing (living people)